Cape Jackson may refer to:

Cape Jackson (Greenland), in northwest Greenland
Cape Jackson, New Zealand in the northeast of New Zealand's South Island